Yeryomino is a rural locality in Polevskoy Selsoviet Rural Settlement, Kursky District, Kursk Oblast, Russia. Population:

Geography 
The village is located on the Seym River (a left tributary of the Desna), 101 km from the Russia–Ukraine border, 22 km south-east of the district center – the town Kursk, 2.5 km from the selsoviet center – Polevaya.

 Climate
Yeryomino has a warm-summer humid continental climate (Dfb in the Köppen climate classification).

Transport 
Yeryomino is located 7 km from the federal route  (Kursk – Voronezh –  "Kaspy" Highway; a part of the European route ), 2.5 km from the road of regional importance  (Kursk – Bolshoye Shumakovo – Polevaya via Lebyazhye), 0.5 km from the road  (R-298 – Polevaya), 3 km from the nearest railway station Polevaya (railway line Klyukva — Belgorod).

The rural locality is situated 21 km from Kursk Vostochny Airport, 109 km from Belgorod International Airport and 189 km from Voronezh Peter the Great Airport.

References

Notes

Sources

Rural localities in Kursky District, Kursk Oblast